Hem kumar Rai is a Nepali politician and a former member of the House of Representatives of the federal parliament of Nepal. He is also a member of the parliamentary Finance Committee. He won his seat from the Solukhumbu-1 constituency as a candidate from Communist Party of Nepal (Maoist Center) of the left alliance, by defeating his nearest rival Bal Bahadur KC of Nepali Congress. He garnered 20,747 votes to KC's 17,294. After his party united with CPN UML to form Nepal Communist Party (NCP), he became the new party's "co-incharge" for Solukhumbu district.

References

Living people
Nepal MPs 2017–2022
Nepal Communist Party (NCP) politicians
Communist Party of Nepal (Maoist Centre) politicians
1983 births